Alexandra Tavernier (born 13 December 1993) is a French hammer thrower. She finished sixth at the 2014 European Championships. She won gold medals at the 2015 European U23 Championships and 2012 World Junior Championships.

Career
On 26 August 2015, when she participated in her first world championships, she improved her personal best by 34 cm in qualifying, bringing her personal best to 74.39 m; thus, she qualified for her first world championship final when she was only 21 years old.  She was second in the qualifying round. 

The next day, she won the bronze medal, her first international medal in the senior ranks with a throw at 74.02 meters.

Tavernier took up athletics in 2004 and until 2014 was coached by her father Christophe. Her father and mother are retired hammer throwers, while her younger brother competes at a junior level.

Competition record

References

External links 
 

1993 births
Living people
Sportspeople from Annecy
French female hammer throwers
World Athletics Championships athletes for France
World Athletics Championships medalists
Athletes (track and field) at the 2016 Summer Olympics
Olympic athletes of France
Mediterranean Games gold medalists for France
Athletes (track and field) at the 2018 Mediterranean Games
Mediterranean Games medalists in athletics
French Athletics Championships winners
Competitors at the 2017 Summer Universiade
Athletes (track and field) at the 2020 Summer Olympics
21st-century French women